Vladimir Aleksandrovich Andrunakievich (Russian: Владимир Александрович Андрунакиевич, 3 April 1917 – 22 July 1997) was a Soviet and Moldovan mathematician, known for his work in abstract algebra. He was a doctor of physical and mathematical sciences (1958), academician (1961) and vice-president (1964—1969, 1979—1990) of the Moldavian Soviet Academy of Sciences. Laureate of the State Prize of the Moldavian SSR (1972).

Andrunakievich was born in Petrograd. He received his Ph.D. from the Moscow State University in 1947 under the supervision of Aleksandr Gennadievich Kurosh and Otto Schmidt.

Monographs 
 Radicals of algebras and structure theory (with Iu. M. Ryabukhin). Moscow: Nauka, 1979.
 Numbers and ideals (with I. D. Chirtoaga). Kishinev: Lumina, 1980.
 Applied problems of solid mechanics. Kishinev: Ştiinţa, 1985.
 Modules, algebras and topologies. Kishinev: Ştiinţa, 1988.
 Constructions of topological rings and modules (with V. I. Arnautov). Kishinev: Ştiinţa, 1988.

Articles

References

1917 births
1997 deaths
20th-century Moldovan mathematicians
Alexandru Ioan Cuza University alumni
Academic staff of the D. Mendeleev University of Chemical Technology of Russia
Academic staff of Moldova State University
Moscow State University alumni
Recipients of the Order of Lenin
Recipients of the Order of the Red Banner of Labour
Recipients of the Order of the Republic (Moldova)
Algebraists
Soviet mathematicians